The 2004 WNBL Finals was the postseason tournament of the WNBL's 2003–04 season. The Canberra Capitals were the two-time defending champions, but were defeated in the Semi-finals by Adelaide. The Dandenong Rangers won the Grand Final over the Sydney Uni Flames, 63–53, taking home their first ever WNBL title.

Standings

Finals

Semi-finals

(1) Dandenong Rangers vs. (2) Sydney Uni Flames

(3) Adelaide Lightning vs. (4) Canberra Capitals

Preliminary final

(2) Sydney Uni Flames vs. (3) Adelaide Lightning

Grand Final

(1) Dandenong Rangers vs. (2) Sydney Uni Flames

Rosters

References 

2004 Finals
2003-04
Women's National Basketball League Finals
2003–04 in Australian basketball
Aus
basketball
basketball